Clube Atlético Patrocinense, commonly known as Patrocinense, or as CAP, is a Brazilian football club based in Patrocínio, Minas Gerais state.

History
The club was founded on 19 March 1954. CAP won the Campeonato Mineiro Third Level in 2000. Deeply in debt, the club eventually folded, and do not play professional games since 2005 to 2016 when return to the Campeonato Mineiro.

Achievements

 Campeonato Mineiro Third Level:
 Winners (1): 2000

Stadium
Clube Atlético Patrocinense played their home games at Estádio Pedro Alves do Nascimento. The stadium has a maximum capacity of 8,500 people.

References

 
Association football clubs established in 1954
1954 establishments in Brazil